Sir Arthur Jared Palmer Howard  (30 May 1896 – 26 April 1971) was a British Army officer and politician.

Howard was the youngest son of Margaret Charlotte Howard, 2nd Baroness Strathcona and Mount Royal and brother of the 3rd Baron.  He was Mayor of Westminster for 1936–1937. He was Conservative Member of Parliament (MP) for Westminster St George's from 1945 to 1950.

Through his wife, Lady Leonora Stanley Baldwin, Howard was the son-in-law of British Prime Minister Stanley Baldwin and Lucy Baldwin, Countess Baldwin of Bewdley.

References

1896 births
1971 deaths
UK MPs 1945–1950
Conservative Party (UK) MPs for English constituencies
Place of birth missing
Members of Westminster Metropolitan Borough Council
Mayors of places in Greater London
Younger sons of barons